Osoriella is a genus of South American anyphaenid sac spiders first described by Cândido Firmino de Mello-Leitão in 1922.

Species
 it contains four species:
Osoriella domingos Brescovit, 1998 – Brazil
Osoriella pallidoemanu Mello-Leitão, 1926 – Brazil
Osoriella rubella (Keyserling, 1891) – Brazil
Osoriella tahela Brescovit, 1998 – Peru, Brazil, Bolivia, Paraguay, Argentina

References

Anyphaenidae
Araneomorphae genera
Spiders of South America
Taxa named by Cândido Firmino de Mello-Leitão